Caenorycta thiobapta is a moth in the family Xyloryctidae. It was described by Edward Meyrick in 1930. It is found on New Guinea.

References

Caenorycta
Moths described in 1930